Douglas Brimson (born 1959 in Hemel Hempstead) is an English film producer, screenwriter and author best known for penning the multi-award-winning feature, Green Street.

Background
After 18 years service with the Royal Air Force, including both the Falklands War and the first Gulf War, the ex-Sergeant engineer's literary career began in 1996 when he co-wrote a book exploring the culture of football hooliganism entitled, Everywhere We Go: Behind the Matchday Madness. He has subsequently written a further 14 books in a variety of genres including fiction thriller and fiction comedy. His latest thriller, In The Know  (the third book in the Billy Evans crime trilogy) was released in May 2020.

In 2003 Brimson made the move into screenwriting with the short film "It's a Casual Life", a 15-minute film looking at the world of football violence from a Casuals perspective. His first full-length feature, the Hollywood funded Green Street starring Elijah Wood, was released in September 2005 and has won numerous awards including:
 Narrative Jury Prize-SXSW Film Festival
 Narrative Feature Audience-SXSW Film Festival
 Best of Festival–Malibu Film Festival
 Jury Award (feature)–Malibu Film Festival
 Official Selection–Tribeca Film Festival

His next feature was an adaptation of his own novel Top Dog. Released in May 2014 starring Leo Gregory and directed by former Spandau Ballet singer and star of The Krays, Martin Kemp, the film won Best Feature at the British Independent Film Festival 2014 as well as a string of acting awards.

November 2014 saw the release of We Still Kill the Old Way, a vigilante thriller starring Ian Ogilvy, Chris Ellison, Steven Berkhoff and Lysette Anthony.

In 2021, Brimson formed his own film production company, Red Bus Movies. Current projects in development include the comedy feature, The Battle For Stathie Manor and the TV thriller, The 45th. 

Brimson has co-hosted a late night comedy show on Liberty Radio, presented The Stock Car Show on Granada Men & Motors and presented the Madder Max show, also on Granada Men & Motors, which examined the diverse world of British motor sport. It began transmission on 24 July 2000 and ran for thirteen consecutive weeks. He has also produced shows for Channel 5 in the UK.

Brimson, who is married to Tina and has three children, is an active member of the British Legion and The Falklands War Veterans Association.

Bibliography
eBooks

fiction Everywhere We Go: Behind the Matchday Madness (1996)

 England, My England: The Trouble with the National Football Team (1996)
 Capital Punishment: London's Violent Football Following (1997)
 Derby Days: Local Football Rivalries and Feuds (1998)
 The Geezers' Guide to Football: A Lifetime of Lads and Lager  (1998)
 Barmy Army: The Changing Face of Football Violence (2000)
 Eurotrashed: The Rise and Rise of Europe's Football Hooligans (2003)
 Kicking Off: Why Hooliganism and Racism Are Killing Football (2006)
 Rebellion: The Growth of Football's Protest Movement (2006)
 March of the Hooligans: Soccer's Bloody Fraternity (2007)Novels' The Crew (1999)
 Billy's Log (2000)
 Top Dog (2001)
 Wings of a Sparrow (2012)
 In The Know (2020)

Filmography (as writer)It's a Casual Life (2003)Green Street (2005)Top Dog (2014)We Still Kill the Old Way (2014)The Battle For Stathie Manor'' (2022)

See also

 Screenwriters
 Lists of writers

References

External links
Dougie Brimson official website
Dougie Brimson's Blog
Interview with Story of a Storyteller - Jan 2021
Interview with Writing Community Chat Show - Sept 2020
Interview with Crime Writers Monthly – May 2020 
Interview with Search My Trash – May 2020
The Carl Reader Show – An interview with Dougie Brimson Sept 2019
Dougie Brimson – From hooligan to Hollywood – May 2019
ISA Connect interview – Mar 2018
Of Page and Pitch – Jul 2016
The Backstory – Mar 2015
BritCrime Interview Aug 2016
Interview about the issue of self-publishing Jul 2016
Top Dog director announced 2013
Dougie Brimson interview 2013
Dougie Brimson interview 2013
Recorded interview with Dougie Brimson 
Interview with 3AM magazine 2008

1959 births
Living people
21st-century English novelists
English male novelists
21st-century English male writers
People from Hemel Hempstead
Royal Air Force airmen
Royal Air Force personnel of the Falklands War
Royal Air Force personnel of the Gulf War
20th-century English male writers